Knut Richard Thyberg (6 November 1896 – 1 April 1980) was a Swedish diplomat. He was Swedish envoy in Rio de Janeiro from 1949 to 1955, and ambassador in Lisbon from 1955 to 1959 and non-resident ambassador in Monrovia from 1958 to 1959.

Career
Thyberg was born on 6 November 1896 in Sunne, Sweden, the son of Edwin Thyberg, a merchant, and his wife Thyra (née Helin). He passed studentexamen in Karlstad in 1914 and became a reserve officer two years later in 1916. In 1918 he received a Candidate of Law degree in Stockholm and started working as an attaché at the Ministry for Foreign Affairs in Stockholm the year after.

Career
Thyberg served in Paris in 1920, London in 1921, Antwerp in 1923 and in New York City in 1923. He was acting administrative officer in 1926 and second legation secretary in Riga with dual accreditation in 1928. He then served in London in 1929, Copenhagen in 1931 and was acting chargé d'affaires in Prague in 1931.

Thyberg served as first legation secretary in Copenhagen in 1933 and was acting chargé d'affaires in Cairo in 1936. He then served as legation counsellor in 1938 and was acting chargé d'affaires in Belgrade from 1938 to 1939 and in Ankara from 1940 to 1941. Thyberg was director of the Political Department at the Foreign Ministry in Stockholm from 1941 to 1944 and was minister plenipotentiary, chargé d'affaires and the Swedish government's agent for monitoring the Greece Commission's aid activities in Athens from 1944 to 1948. He was then envoy in Rio de Janeiro from 1949 to 1955, envoy and ambassador in Lisbon from 1955 to 1959 with dual accreditation in Monrovia from 1958 to 1959. Thyberg remained in the Swedish diplomatic service for two years before retiring in 1961.

Personal life
On 3 October 1925, Thyberg married Margaret Dows, the daughter of Tracy Dows and Alice Olin Dows of Rhinebeck, New York, USA and sister of artist Olin Dows. The marriage took place at Foxhollow Farm in Rhinebeck, the country place of her parent. They had three children; ambassador Knut Thyberg (born 1926), Birgitta (born 1928) and Peter Jan (born 1933).

Awards and decorations
Thyberg's awards:

Commanders First Class of the Order of the Polar Star
Grand Cross of the Order of the Southern Cross
Grand Cross of the Order of the Phoenix
Commanders First Class of the Order of the Lion of Finland
Grand Officer of the Order of St. Sava
Grand Officer of the Order of Orange-Nassau
Officer of the Order of the Three Stars
Knight of the Order of the Dannebrog
Officer of the Ordre des Palmes Académiques

References

1896 births
1980 deaths
Ambassadors of Sweden to Brazil
Ambassadors of Sweden to Portugal
Ambassadors of Sweden to Liberia
People from Sunne Municipality
Commanders First Class of the Order of the Polar Star